Sergio Bello (born 6 May 1942) is an Italian former sprinter, third with the 4x400 metres relay at the 1971 European Athletics Championships. He was born in Intra.

Biography
Bello has 45 caps in Italy national athletics team (from 1961 to 1972). In his career he participated in three editions of the Olympic Games and won the Italian Athletics Championships 6 times.

Achievements

National titles
5 wins in 400 metres at the Italian Athletics Championships (1965, 1966, 1967, 1968, 1969)
1 win in 400 metres hurdles at the Italian Athletics Championships (1970)

See also
 Italy national athletics team - More caps
 Italy national relay team

References

External links
 

1942 births
Living people
Italian male sprinters
Olympic athletes of Italy
Athletes (track and field) at the 1964 Summer Olympics
Athletes (track and field) at the 1968 Summer Olympics
Athletes (track and field) at the 1972 Summer Olympics
European Athletics Championships medalists
Mediterranean Games gold medalists for Italy
Athletes (track and field) at the 1967 Mediterranean Games
Athletes (track and field) at the 1971 Mediterranean Games
Universiade medalists in athletics (track and field)
Mediterranean Games medalists in athletics
Universiade gold medalists for Italy
Universiade bronze medalists for Italy
Italian Athletics Championships winners
Medalists at the 1963 Summer Universiade
Medalists at the 1965 Summer Universiade
Medalists at the 1967 Summer Universiade
People from Intra
Sportspeople from the Province of Verbano-Cusio-Ossola